Abraham Jones (c. 1739-after 1787) was a politician in North Carolina, in the North Carolina General Assembly of 1778 and a colonel over the Hyde County Regiment of the North Carolina militia from 1779 to 1783.

Military service
Jones was appointed colonel of the Hyde County Regiment in 1779.  He served alongside Colonel William Russel until the end of the Revolutionary War in 1783.   Jones was elected to represent Hyde County in the North Carolina House of Commons in 1778 and 1779.   He served in the North Carolina Senate in 1782 and 1784 to 1787.

References

Year of death missing
18th-century American people
North Carolina militiamen in the American Revolution
North Carolina state senators
Members of the North Carolina House of Representatives
Year of birth uncertain
Members of the North Carolina Provincial Congresses